Łukasz Szczurek (born 1 April 1988 in Sanok, Poland) is a Polish biathlete. He competed in the 2010 Winter Olympics for Poland.

References

External links 
 
 
 
 

Living people
1988 births
Polish male biathletes
Olympic biathletes of Poland
Biathletes at the 2010 Winter Olympics
Biathletes at the 2014 Winter Olympics
People from Sanok
Sportspeople from Podkarpackie Voivodeship